Jesús González Álvarez (born 9 September 1974) is a Spanish rower. He competed in the men's lightweight coxless four event at the 2004 Summer Olympics.

References

External links
 

1974 births
Living people
Spanish male rowers
Olympic rowers of Spain
Rowers at the 2004 Summer Olympics
Sportspeople from Pontevedra